The  is an AC electric multiple unit (EMU) train type operated by Hokkaido Railway Company (JR Hokkaido) on limited express services in Hokkaido, Japan, since 2002. Two variants exist: the original 789 series for use on Lilac services (Formerly used on Super Hakuchō services), and the  series for use on Kamui and Suzuran services. Also, it has three related train types, the KiHa 261 series, KiHa 281 series and KiHa 283 series, all of which run on diesel.

Lilac 789-0 series

The trainsets were formed as four 2-car half sets, HE-101–104, and five 3-car half-sets, HE-201–205, which were coupled to produce 5- or 8-car formations.

From December 2005, new SaHa  trailer cars were added to the original 2-car sets HE-101–104, and a fifth set, HE-105 was delivered. Two additional 2-car sets, HE-301 and HE-302, were also delivered for extending trains to up to eight cars during period seasons.

Two new 3-car sets, HE-106 and HE-206, were delivered in April 2011.

In March 2016, Super Hakucho services were discontinued because the new Hokkaido Shinkansen services ran on the same route, this meant that the 789-0 services (along with the  series trains) operating on the Super Hakucho services were completely taken out of service.

From the start of the revised timetable on 4 March 2017, Lilac limited express services were reintroduced between Sapporo and Asahikawa using six-car  series EMUs previously used on Super Hakucho services until March 2016. These services complement the Kamui services using five-car  series EMUs.

Formations

(There is no information on the Lilac service formations yet.)

December 2002 – December 2005

Cars 2, 4, and 7 were each fitted with one N-PS789 single-arm pantograph.

December 2005 – March 2016

Cars 2, 5, and 7 are each fitted with one N-PS789 single-arm pantograph.

Interior

Kamui and Suzuran 789-1000 series

These replaced the Lilac services formerly operated by 781 series EMUs.

The  sets differ from the earlier Super Hakuchō and Kamui sets in not having gangway doors beneath the driving cabs.

Set HL-1005 was withdrawn in March 2011 following damage sustained in a level crossing collision on 29 January 2010.

From the start of the revised timetable on 4 March 2017, Super Kamui services were renamed simply Kamui, and are complemented by newly introduced Lilac limited express services, which uses six-car  series EMUs.

Formations

Car 3 is fitted with one N-PS785 single-arm pantograph.

Interior
The  series trainsets do not include Green class (first class) accommodation, but car 4 is designated as a "u-Seat" car with improved seating for reserved seat passengers. All other cars are normally designated as non-reserved seating.

References

External links

 JR Hokkaido 789 series Super Hakuchō 
 JR Hokkaido 785/789 series Super Kamui 
 JR Hokkaido 785/789 series Suzuran 
 JR Hokkaido 789-0 series (Japan Railfan Magazine) 
 JR Hokkaido 789-1000 series (Japan Railfan Magazine) 

Electric multiple units of Japan
Hokkaido Railway Company
Train-related introductions in 2002
20 kV AC multiple units
Kawasaki multiple units